Perfluoromethyldiethylamine is a tertiary perfluorinated amine with the chemical formula C5F13N.  The compound consists of two pentafluoroethyl and one trifluoromethyl groups connected to nitrogen. The compound is produced for the electronics industry, along with other perfluoroalkylamines.  Unlike ordinary amines, perfluoroamines are nonbasic.

Preparation and use
Perfluoroalkylamines are prepared by electrofluorination of the parent amine using hydrogen fluoride as solvent and source of fluorine.
The compound has two commercial uses, although details are often proprietary.  It is a component in Fluosol, artificial blood.  This application exploits the high solubility of oxygen and carbon dioxide in the solvent, as well as the low viscosity and toxicity.  It is also a component of Fluorinert coolant liquids.  CPUs of some computers are immersed in this liquid to facilitate cooling.

Safety
Perfluoroalkyl amines are generally of very low toxicity, so much that they have been evaluated as synthetic blood.

References

Perfluorinated compounds
Amines
Trifluoromethyl compounds